Batman: Earth One is a series of graphic novels written by Geoff Johns and illustrated by Gary Frank. The series is a modernized re-imagining of DC Comics' long-running Batman comic book franchise as part of the company's Earth One imprint. Earth One's Batman exists alongside other revamped DC characters in Earth One titles, including Superman: Earth One and Wonder Woman: Earth One, as well as other graphic novels.

The premise of Batman: Earth One takes place in the alternate continuity of the Earth One universe, which features an updated and more realistic reinterpretation of Batman's story. While the characters presented remain relatively faithful to their original counterparts from the DC Universe, they still differ from each other in a number of notable aspects and characteristics. For instance: Batman himself, who is usually depicted as a near-perfect crime-fighter in the comic books, is portrayed in the novels as inexperienced and constantly prone to mistakes, although he gains practice and becomes more competent as the volumes go by.

Announced in 2009, the Batman: Earth One series was launched with the publication of its Volume One on July 4, 2012. Later that same year, Volume Two was confirmed for release in 2013, but was postponed and debuted on May 6, 2015. Originally announced for a release in 2018, Volume Three, the final volume in the series, had been pushed back for three years until published on June 8, 2021. The series received a mostly positive response from both critics and readers, with Johns' writing and unique, realistic and humanizing re-imagining of the titular character, along with Frank's artwork, being singled out for praise.

Plot summary

Volume One 
Bruce Wayne is the eight-year-old son of Dr. Thomas Wayne, a mayoral candidate for Gotham City, and Martha Wayne ( Arkham). After receiving death threats, Thomas contacts his friend Alfred Pennyworth to become the head of security at Wayne Manor. During an outing with his parents, Bruce is taken hostage by a mugger. He demands that the Waynes pay a ransom for the return of their son and attempts to remove Martha's pearl necklace. Thomas tries to intervene and the criminal shoots them both in front of Bruce. Following Bruce's return to Wayne Manor, Alfred learns that he has been named as Bruce's legal guardian by the Wayne parents in the event of their absence. Alfred agrees and presents himself to Bruce as his butler.

As a teenager, Bruce befriends his classmate, Jessica Dent, and develops a rivalry with her twin brother, Harvey. He also learns about Arkham Manor, where Martha lived as a child; her mother suffered a mental breakdown when Martha was 12-year-old, murdering her husband and then committing suicide. Arkham Manor is believed to be cursed due to the actions of Martha's mother, causing all members of the Arkham bloodline to become insane. Bruce convinces Alfred to train him in various forms of martial arts and acrobatics; and also learns investigative techniques. Following this training, he discovers evidence that Mayor Oswald Cobblepot was involved in his parents' assassination.

Years later, Bruce's investigation leads him to Jacob Weaver, a police detective who was the first to arrive at the Waynes' murder scene and later left the police to work in the mayor's office. Bruce dons a bat-themed costume as a disguise to frighten his parents' alleged killers. He attacks Weaver, but the grapple gun he developed malfunctions and Weaver escapes. Bruce then seeks the help of Lucius Fox, a 22-year-old intern at Wayne Medical, who agrees to repair his equipment in exchange for funding for a project to develop artificial limbs for amputees, which Fox wants to use to give his five-year-old niece a new arm. Meanwhile, Detective James Gordon of the Gotham City Police Department meets his new partner, Harvey Bullock, an experienced LAPD detective who has come to Gotham to solve the Wayne murders in order to revive a fading career. Following an altercation between Cobblepot's bodyguards and Bruce at a function organized by the mayor, Bruce's alter ego is named "Batman" by the press and the topic becomes a public sensation. Cobblepot, infuriated by Batman's actions at the event, orders one of his henchmen, a serial killer named "Birthday Boy", to take care of Weaver. Birthday Boy kills Weaver, and Batman's investigation takes him to Arkham Manor, where Birthday Boy had been placing his victims.

A chain of events leads to the kidnapping of Gordon's 17-year-old daughter, Barbara, by Axe, a petty thug who previously antagonized Gordon, at the behest of Cobblepot. Gordon learns that Bullock is indirectly responsible for Barbara's kidnapping, since Bullock checked out the Thomas And Martha Wayne murder files under Gordon's name, and Gordon was threatened by Cobblepot to stay out of the archives to keep him from discovering his complicity in the murders. An apologetic Bullock helps Gordon find Axe, who is violently forced to reveal Barbara's location. While she struggles against Birthday Boy, Batman, Gordon and Bullock unite in the search for her. Batman eventually intercepts Birthday Boy while Gordon rescues Barbara; Batman overpowers the serial killer, who is then arrested by Gordon and Bullock. In a subsequent confrontation between Batman and Cobblepot, the mayor reveals his intention was for Weaver to murder Thomas, but he and his wife ran into the mugger instead. Cobblepot then prepares to kill an unmasked Bruce but is fatally shot by Alfred. Axe is arrested and Birthday Boy, whose identity is revealed as Ray Salinger, is transferred to the Crane Institute for the Criminally Insane, run by Dr. Jonathan Crane, from which Salinger originally escaped.

Barbara begins to idolize Batman, studying martial arts and criminology, and sketching potential "Batgirl" costumes. Bullock, on the other hand, is traumatized by his experiences and succumbs to alcoholism. After Cobblepot's crimes are posthumously outed, he is replaced by Jessica as the mayor of Gotham. Fox, after seeing Batman uses the grapple gun he repaired for Bruce on the news, deduces that the young billionaire is the vigilante and begins building a bat-themed arsenal for him, hoping to become a part of the action. Bruce is left disappointed by the truth behind his parents' death, but with Alfred's encouragement, decides that he will continue on to refine his new persona as Batman. The story concludes with the depiction of an enigmatic man reviewing information on Batman.

Volume Two 

The events depicted in Volume Two occur six months after those of Volume One. A mysterious serial killer, who calls himself "The Riddler", is murdering people in Gotham, hoping to get Batman's attention. Elsewhere, after losing track of one of the drug dealers he fought during a car chase, Bruce has Fox (who is promoted as the Head of Wayne Enterprises' Research and Development department) build him a custom-made race car. Bullock remains traumatized over the travesties that occurred in Arkham Manor, and Gordon tries to help him to combat his alcoholism, as he needs Bullock as an ally in order to combat corruption in Gotham.

Jessica comes to Wayne Manor to visit Bruce in the hopes that, as the CEO of Wayne Enterprises, he could help her find five of the remaining members of Cobblepot's criminal organization within the city's legislature. Despite Cobblepot's death, his criminal empire remains active because of these five members. The corrupt officials have taken over the city's police department, housing commission, public works, city council and the state court. Along with her brother Harvey, Jessica is desperate to find the officials in order to destroy Cobblepot's legacy once and for all, and Batman seeks Gordon's help in uncovering the identities of these corrupt officials.

After bombing the city museum, the Riddler is chased by Batman, who during the chase is knocked out from behind by the Riddler and falls off a building, landing on a balcony. Batman wakes up the next day to find himself inside the apartment of an attractive woman who has tended to his injuries. Seeing Gordon's excellence as a detective, Batman asks Gordon to train him in forensics and deduction, with Gordon notes that Batman has a gifted investigative mind. As they track their murderous suspect to the sewers (called the "Arkham's Labyrinth"), Batman encounters Waylon Jones, a benign but mutated man whom the media dubbed "Killer Croc", who is seeking refuge underground out of fear of society's discrimination over his reptilian appearance. With Jones' help, Batman discovers the Riddler's hideout, but fails to stop him from bombing a rapid transit train. Using discovered clues, Batman deduces that these killings were not random, as they were actually targeted. He leaves Gordon an encrypted cellphone for the detective to contact him, calling it his "Bat-Signal".

Meeting with Bruce, Jessica reveals to him that she knows he is Batman since her visit to Wayne Manor; both also declare their love for each other as they kiss. With new information from Gordon, Bruce discovers the Riddler is targeting the people who Jessica and Harvey are trying to find. Bruce is later accused of being the Riddler after the real Riddler frames him in an attempt to divert Gordon's investigation, but Jessica is able to provide Bruce an alibi so he is not arrested. During a riot at the police precinct caused by the Riddler, Cobblepot's former henchman Sal Maroni fatally stabs Harvey and then disfigures the right side of his face with a Molotov cocktail before he dies. Jessica, in her grief, scars the left side of her face by pressing it against Harvey's burns in order to match her face with his. After chasing the Riddler through the city, Batman manages to subdue the killer with Jones' assistance.

After he is cleared of all charges, Bruce generously writes a check to help the city's police department rebuild their precinct. Bullock begins to recover from his alcoholism. Batman offers Jones a place in Wayne Manor, seeking his help in finding a location to hide his "Batmobile". After Gordon arrests Christopher Black, a police captain who was one of Cobblepot's lieutenants, he is promoted to captain. Upon visiting her at the hospital, Bruce discovers that the trauma caused Jessica to develop a split personality based on Harvey's. In the epilogue, Bruce finds out through a phone call with Alfred that the attractive woman he met earlier as Batman is not the apartment's resident, but actually a cat burglar who was robbing the building at the time.

Volume Three 

The events depicted in Volume Three occur one month after those of Volume Two. In Upstate Maine, a police officer sees that an abandoned psychiatric hospital has been broken into. Inside, he finds a delusional elderly man who attacks him, yelling for his daughter Martha.

Bruce, Alfred and Jones find an old subterranean subway station that connects Wayne and Arkham Manors to the rest of Gotham. Bruce plans to use the place both as a bunker to hide his new Batmobile and as a safehouse to expand his operation as Batman. Suddenly, Gordon calls him through the Bat-Signal to alert him of criminals with military-grade weapons. Batman arrives and stops them, with the last man incapacitated by the cat-burglar he met a month earlier, who escapes with the criminals' stolen money. Jessica – wearing a mask – is escorted by Bruce to a press conference where she opens a homeless shelter named after Harvey. During the conference, Alfred and Bruce are called to the Gotham Mental Hospital, where they learn that the elderly man who broke into the psychiatric hospital in Maine is actually Adrian Arkham, Bruce's maternal grandfather, thought to be long-deceased. Skeptical that his grandfather might be alive, Bruce still takes Adrian to Wayne Manor.

Batman learns of a weapons shipment deal, where he sees that a criminal uprising is brewing in Gotham, fueled by advanced weaponry brought in from Metropolis. He is caught and a firefight ensues, but the woman from earlier (Catwoman) saves him. He interrogates the criminals and learns that Harvey Dent might be alive and behind the uprising. Bruce remembers Jessica waking up after her accident and briefly claiming to be Harvey. Worried, Batman meets with Jessica to confront her, only for "Harvey" to call her and tell them that he's going to destroy Gotham. Adrian escapes to Arkham Manor and tries to jump from the roof, but Bruce stops him. Adrian reveals the history of their ancestors: as the Arkhams helped build the city, they were viciously attacked by bats, which they believed to be representatives of native spirits. He claims that these events bound a terrible curse to the Arkham bloodline. Adrian describes how his wife went mad over the loss of her son, and tried to kill Martha; he claims to have sacrificed his life to save their daughter. Bruce brings his grandfather home, promising to help him work through his worsening mental health.

Catwoman alerts Batman of the final shipment of explosives arriving in Gotham that night. Gordon and Bullock head off to stop it. As the weapons arrive, Adrian lights Arkham Manor on fire, while Batman and Gordon learn that Jessica Dent is Harvey Dent, suffering from a dissociative identity disorder. Adrian reveals his allegiance to Dent and forces Batman inside the ablaze Arkham Manor. Dent wants to destroy Gotham for taking so many lives, including that of her brother's, while Adrian claims he wants to save Bruce's soul. Batman frees himself with Catwoman's help and subdues Adrian. Learning that Gordon has halted the explosives shipment, a distraught Dent leaps to her death, but is saved by Waylon at the last moment. Adrian emerges from Arkham Manor, his face 'melting', and tries to kill Batman before Gordon stops him. With the crisis averted, Gotham is safe. Bruce learns that Adrian was actually an imposter capable of changing his appearance at a cellular level, with layers of fingerprints from three different men (Preston Payne, Matt Hagen, and Basil Karlo) found beneath his layers of shifting skin. Bruce promises to get Jessica the help she needs and decides to continue his mission to protect Gotham, unburdened by the troubled history of his family.

Time passes with Bruce becoming an experienced crimefighter, recruiting more "outsiders" to help save Gotham. During a performance at Haly's Circus, a "clown" kills the circus' prized Flying Graysons act. This leaves the late Grayson couple's young son Dick an orphan, who is taken in by Bruce to eventually become a member of Batman's crusade. Captain Gordon's daughter Barbara wants to learn more about Gotham's caped crusader, and she eventually dons a costume as well. After facing rampant injustice and persecution in the city, Rory Regan too decides to take matters into his own hands and fight back against Gotham's criminal underbelly. Soon, Robin, Batgirl, and Ragman join Batman, Alfred, Waylon, Lucius Fox, and Catwoman as members of this new Outsiders team, headed out of the subway base (now called the Batcave). Bruce also helps turn his mother's home into a state-of-the-art mental health facility called Arkham Asylum, with Jessica becoming a patient. Later, Winslow Schott's prisoner transport is stopped by a mysterious clown. The clown claims he needs 'the Toyman's' help to "kill a lot of children, and their pets". When Schott asks who his new employer is, the clown replies "I'm Nobody".

Publication 
Batman: Earth One Volume One is the second original graphic novel to be announced by DC Comics as part of the Earth One line established in 2009. It follows the 2010 release of Superman: Earth One, marking the first collaboration between writer Geoff Johns and artist Gary Frank on a Batman story. Batman: Earth One was planned to be printed in 2010, but was held to be released at the same time as The Dark Knight Rises film on July 4, 2012. Volume Two was originally scheduled for a 2013 release, but was postponed and, as a result, launched on May 6, 2015.

After 2012's Volume One and 2015's Volume Two of Batman: Earth One, Volume Three was originally announced to debut in 2018, but was pushed back for 2021 due to Johns and Frank's work on DC Rebirth and Doomsday Clock. Volume Three was "finished" and ultimately published on June 8, 2021, resulting in a six-year gap between Volumes Two and Three, exactly twice the gap between Volumes One and Two.

Reception 
Volume One
Batman: Earth One received a mostly positive response from critics and readers, with Johns' writing and unique, realistic and humanizing re-imagining of the titular character, along with Frank's artwork, being singled out for praise. Barnes & Noble lists the graphic novel as one of the "Best Quirky, Beautiful, Different Books of 2012". It peaked at #9 on The New York Times''' Hardcover Graphic Book Best Seller List. IGN listed it as #25 on their list of best Batman stories of all time.Entertainment Weekly wrote: "Fresh, accessible, emotionally resonant…. This Batman graphic novel offers readers the chance to watch Batman actually grow and develop — through trial and error, success and failure — into an indomitable crime fighter". David S. Goyer, co-writer of Batman Begins, The Dark Knight Rises, Man of Steel and Batman v Superman: Dawn of Justice, said: "After successfully re-imagining the Man of Steel in Superman: Secret Origin, Geoff Johns and Gary Frank have unleashed their talents on Bruce Wayne and proven, once again, that under the right stewardship, the Batman legend is endlessly malleable. Alfred as a former Royal Marine. The Penguin as a genuinely creepy and sadistic villain. Awesome". HuffPost wrote: "The book was so thoroughly captivating that my most burning question for Johns was whether or not we'll see more". Damon Lindelof, co-creator and executive producer of Lost, said: "Original, surprising and emotional, Batman: Earth One is a must-read".

In his review for Batman: Earth One, Joey Esposito of IGN wrote positively about the novel, complimenting both Johns' writing and Frank's artwork, as well as the characters featured in it, especially Bullock, "whose journey is perhaps the most profoundly jarring throughout the course of the book", added Esposito. By the end of the review, he stated, "Batman: Earth One is a resounding success. There’s no supplemental material to speak of, but the beautiful characterization, interesting new direction, and stunning artwork makes it an easy recommendation. When Superman: Earth One disappointed it left me cold on these books completely, but Johns and Frank have rejuvenated this line tenfold and made sure that Batman fans have a great new graphic novel to rave about". Writing for GamesRadar+, David Pepose was more critical to Batman: Earth One: he gave the graphic novel a rating of 4 out of 10, considering it "too ambitious", while also commenting that Johns "throws together enough decent ideas to fill six graphic novels, but having them all together leads to a scattered, unfocused read". Regarding the characters, Pepose felt that, due to the fast pace of the novel, fan readers were unable to "really stick around with anyone long enough to get to know them". However, he praised the depictions of Alfred and Cobblepot as a "badass" and a "true power player", respectively; another character that Pepose complimented was Gordon's daughter, Barbara, deeming her "[by] far and away the most endearing character in the entire book".

Volume Two
The second volume received a widely positive response from readers and critics, with noting the improvement in storytelling and character work from the first volume, along with Frank's artwork and Johns' unique take on classic Batman characters being singled out for praise. Brian Truitt of USA Today stated that this version of Batman "is neither a 'definitive' version nor one that blows the rest away", but still liked the more interesting, unique and realistic re-imagining of the classic Batman mythos and praised the gradual evolution of Batman's role as a skilled crime-fighter. The graphic novel has made into #1 on The New York Times' Hardcover Graphic Books Best Seller List.

In a review for Volume Two of Batman: Earth One, J. Caleb Mozzocco of Comic Book Resources praised the novel as "stronger" and more "enjoyable" than the first volume, in addition to comparing the two volumes: "If the first volume read like a pitch for a big-budget TV show, this one read more like a movie, albeit the middle movie in an intended trilogy. Despite the occasional, minor weaknesses, however, Johns and Frank were both apparently much more comfortable and confident in their work on this volume, and it's a vast improvement over the first volume". As for the characters, Mozzocco highlighted both the "refreshing" take on Killer Croc and the twist about the origin of Earth One's Two-Face, saying it "should prove interesting in future volumes", apart from also regarding the betterment of Batman's skills as a detective as the greatest improvement in the second volume, albeit he criticized the Riddler's design as "weak", describing him as "basically just a scruffy, shirtless guy in a long green coat, with a question-mark face tattoo".

Reviewing Volume Two of Batman: Earth One, Matt Santori of Comicosity gave the graphic novel a rating of 8.5 out of 10, and said: "Another great addition to the Earth One universe, establishing the youth and inexperience of these heroes in a way we haven't seen on the comic page in decades, Batman: Earth One Volume [Two] is a definite buy for any fan of the Dark Knight, but particularly a good one for the uninitiated when paired with Volume [One]. He may not represent the monolith that we know him to be today, but this Batman is aggressively human, and is a great place to start if you want to see a Dark Knight built from the ground up". Terry Miles Jr. of Batman News commented on how the twists and changes in the characters proved to be the most appealing part of Volume Two for him. According to Miles, a "notable change" in the Batman: Earth One series is the relationship between Batman and Alfred, which is not only a contrast to the usual dynamic of the duo in the comics, but also reflects the relationship between retired Bruce Wayne and his successor Terry McGinnis seen in the animated series Batman Beyond, set in the DC Animated Universe.

 In other media 
 Television 
In the TV show Gotham, Alfred (portrayed by Sean Pertwee) takes inspiration from both his mainstream and his Earth One counterparts, drawing elements from the two versions, such as him being a former member of the Royal Marines who is the loyal butler of the Wayne family, and later becomes the legal guardian of Bruce (David Mazouz) following the murder of his parents. Alfred is also a skilled martial artist, just like his Earth One incarnation, training Bruce in the combat skills he eventually uses in his adulthood as Batman.

Beware the Batman (TV Series.)  Alfred is a former member of the Royal Marines and Bruce guardian and butler and Master  

 Films 
 In the 2016 film Batman v Superman: Dawn of Justice, Alfred (Jeremy Irons) is based on the Earth One iteration of the character.
 The 2022 film The Batman features various similarities with the Batman: Earth One graphic novel. Such similarities include: the portrayal of a still young and inexperienced Batman (Robert Pattinson) at the beginning of his career as a crime-fighter, the Riddler (Paul Dano) being a serial killer targeting Gotham City's corrupt elite, the depiction of Alfred (Andy Serkis) as a former Royal Marine responsible for training Bruce in combat, as well as the revelation that Martha Wayne is a member of the Arkham family.

 Video games 
The 2011 video game Batman: Arkham City and its 2013 prequel Batman: Arkham Origins feature a number of alternative outfits for Batman to wear, including one based on the costume used by the Earth One version of the character.

 Comic books 
The Earth One version of Batman makes a cameo appearance in the 10th issue of Batman: Arkham Unhinged''.

See also 
 List of Batman comics

References

External links 
 

2012 graphic novels
2015 graphic novels
2021 graphic novels
American graphic novels
Batman graphic novels
Batman storylines
Batman titles
Crime graphic novels
DC Comics graphic novels
DC Comics titles
Earth One (DC graphic novel series)
Organized crime in fiction
Police corruption in fiction
Superhero graphic novels
Works by Geoff Johns